St Mary & St Hugh's Church is a Church of England parish church in Churchgate Street, Old Harlow in Essex, England.

The church is of medieval origin and was given Grade II listed status on 5 July 1950. The church has a cruciform plan with a tower at the crossing with a tall shingled broach spire. It was completely restored by architect Henry Woodyer, 1878–80.

References

External links
  The official website of St Mary & St Hugh's, Old Harlow

Old Harlow
Old Harlow